Zully Barrantes is a Peruvian beauty pageant titleholder who was crowned as Miss Earth Peru 2015 and Peru's representative in Miss Earth 2015.

Pageantry

Miss Universe Peru 2014
Zully first tried to join pageantry through Miss Universe Peru 2014 where the winner would compete at Miss Universe 2014 pageant. When the pageant had concluded, Jimena Espinoza was hailed as the winner.

Miss Earth Peru 2015
Zully once again joined but this time, under Miss Earth Peru. She competed along with thirteen other contestants. At the end of event, she was proclaimed as Miss Earth Peru 2015. Her elemental court is composed of Janis Baluarte of Lima (Miss Earth air Peru), Sidney Estrada from Arequipa (Miss Earth Water Peru) and Maria Carolina Salas from Cuzco (Miss Earth Fire Peru). She was crowned by her successor, Elba Fahsbender during the national finals. The event was held at the Convention Center Costa Verde de Magdalena.

Miss Earth 2015
Winning the Miss Earth Peru 2015 title, Zully is Peru's representative to be Miss Earth 2015 and would try to succeed Jamie Herrell as the next Miss Earth.

References

thatbeautyqueen.com

Miss Earth 2015 contestants
Peruvian beauty pageant winners
People from Pucallpa
Living people
1994 births